The Garden of Serenity or Jingyuan (靜園) is a museum and former residence of Puyi, the last emperor of China in Tianjin, China.

History 
Located at 70 Anshan Road (then Miyajima Road) in the then Tianjin Japanese Concession, the Garden of Serenity was the residence of Lu Zongyu , a warlord of the Anfu family, and a member of the Senate during the Republican era. In 1929, Puyi moved to the villa and changed the name to "Jingyuan''. Puyi lived there until 1931 before moving to Manchukuo. 

The building was later used for offices and was subsequently renovated and changed with parts of the  Garden of Serenity being demolished.Buildings added to Garden of Serenity  after Puyi's departure were later demolished in the 2000s in an attempt to restore the building to its previous appearance during the 1920s and 1930s before becoming a museum.
Today the museum displays exhibits and displays relating to Puyi, the last emperor of China

Gallery

See also 

 Foreign concessions in Tianjin
 Wanrong
 Wenxiu

References 

Museums in Tianjin
Buildings and structures in Tianjin